Jacob S. Mauney Memorial Library and Teacher's Home, also known as the Mauney Memorial Library and Dr. Jacob George Van Buren Hord House, is a historic home and library located at Kings Mountain, Cleveland County, North Carolina. It was built in 1923 as a private dwelling and donated to the city of Kings Mountain in 1947. From 1947 to about 1962–1963, the building also functioned as a teacherage for the Kings Mountain school system. It is a two-story, five bay, yellow-brick Southern Colonial Revival-style house. The front facade features a two-story, pedimented tetrastyle portico with stucco-finished masonry columns. It has a one-story rear block added in 1987–1988 and the Harris Children's Wing, a two-level addition of 1999–2000.

It was listed on the National Register of Historic Places in 2014.

References 

Kings Mountain, North Carolina
Libraries on the National Register of Historic Places in North Carolina
Colonial Revival architecture in North Carolina
Houses completed in 1923
Buildings and structures in Cleveland County, North Carolina
National Register of Historic Places in Cleveland County, North Carolina
1923 establishments in North Carolina